The Think break is a drum break that has been widely sampled in popular music. It comes from the 1972 song "Think (About It)" by the American soul singer Lyn Collins, written and produced by James Brown. The drum break was performed by John "Jabo" Starks.

Background and impact 
In 1987, "Think (About It)" was featured on the 16th volume of the drum break compilation Ultimate Breaks & Beats, a highly popular series among hip hop producers. That year marked the first known use of the "Woo! Yeah!" break, when the Beatmasters, a British hip hop production trio, sampled the break for Cookie Crew's song "Females (Get On Up)". While "Females" was a minor hit in the UK, the break did not receive major airplay and attention until the following year, when it was used as the backing loop for the 1988 song "It Takes Two" by MC Rob Base & DJ E-Z Rock. The song, which is almost entirely composed of sampled parts from "Think (About It)", became a platinum-selling hit.

It became almost ubiquitous in dance and hip hop records during the late 1980s and early 1990s and continues to see use.

In addition to the famous "Woo! Yeah!" sample, another part of the drum break has seen prominent use in songs of diverse breakbeat subgenres such as jungle, drum and bass and breakcore. The sample contains a short, ad-libbed shout by one of the musicians, and is usually played at a higher speed, giving the shout a very recognizable character.

References

Sampling (music)
Sampled drum breaks
James Brown
1972 compositions